Lieutenant General Percy Kirke (c. 1646 – 31 October 1691), English soldier, was the son of George Kirke, a court official to Charles I and Charles II.

Career
In 1666 Kirke obtained his first Army commission in Lord Admiral's regiment, and subsequently served in the Blues. In 1673 he was with Monmouth at Maastricht during the Franco-Dutch War and was present during two campaigns with Turenne on the Rhine. In 1680 he was promoted Lieutenant-Colonel, and soon afterwards Colonel of the 2nd Tangier Regiment (afterwards the King's Own Royal Lancaster Regiment). In 1682 he became Governor of Tangier and colonel of the Tangier Regiment (afterwards the Queens Royal West Surrey Regiment).

In the view of the historian Thomas Babington Macaulay, he was "a military adventurer whose vices had been developed by the worst of all schools, Tangier.... Within the ramparts of his fortress he was a despotic prince. The only check on his tyranny was the fear of being called to account by a distant and a careless government. He might therefore safely proceed to the most audacious excesses of rapacity, licentiousness, and cruelty. He lived with boundless dissoluteness, and procured by extortion the means of indulgence."

Kirke commanded his regiment at the Battle of Sedgemoor in July 1685 during the Monmouth Rebellion and then ruthlessly hunted down the fugitives after the battle.

Brigadier Kirke took a notable part in the Glorious Revolution three years later, and William III promoted him. He commanded at the relief of Derry, breaking the Jacobite Irish Army's siege of the city. Following the Battle of the Boyne on 1 July 1690, he oversaw the Capture of Waterford, Ireland's second largest settlement at the time, on 25 July 1690. He took part in his last campaign in Flanders in 1691.

He was appointed a Groom of the Bedchamber to King William from 1689 to his death. He also briefly served as MP for West Looe as a Tory in 1689–90.

He died, with the rank of Lieutenant General, at Brussels on 31 October 1691. His eldest son, Lieutenant General Percy Kirke (1684–1741), was also colonel of the Lambs.

Notes

References

|-

1640s births
1691 deaths
Royal Horse Guards officers
Williamite military personnel of the Williamite War in Ireland
English generals
Governors of the Dominion of New England
Governors of Tangier
Soldiers of the Tangier Garrison
Members of the Parliament of England for West Looe
English MPs 1689–1690